Listed below are the dates and results for the 1986 FIFA World Cup qualification rounds for the South American zone (CONMEBOL). For an overview of the qualification rounds, see the article 1986 FIFA World Cup qualification.

A total of 10 CONMEBOL teams entered the competition. The South American zone was allocated 4 places (out of 24) in the final tournament.

South America's qualifying berths were taken by Argentina, Uruguay, Brazil and Paraguay.

Tournament Structure

The 10 teams were divided into 3 groups. The teams played against each other on a home-and-away basis. The number of teams and spots for each group were as follows:
Group 1 had 4 teams. The group winner would qualify. The runner-up and 3rd-placed team would advance to the CONMEBOL Play-offs.
Groups 2 and 3 had 3 teams each. The group winners would qualify. The runners-up would advance to the CONMEBOL Play-offs.
In the Play-offs, the 4 teams played a in knockout tournament, with matches on a home-and-away basis. The tournament winner would qualify.

Group 1

Group 2

Group 3

Play-offs

First round

|}

First Leg

Second Leg

Paraguay won 4–2 on aggregate and advanced to the Final Round.
 

Chile won 5–2 on aggregate and advanced to the Final Round.

Final round

|}

First Leg

Second Leg

Paraguay won 5–2 on aggregate and qualified for the World Cup.

Qualified teams
The following four teams from CONMEBOL qualified for the final tournament.

1 Bold indicates champions for that year. Italic indicates hosts for that year.

Goalscorers

7 goals

 Jorge Orlando Aravena Plaza

4 goals

 Julio César Romero

3 goals

 Diego Maradona
 Pedro Pasculli
 Hugo Rubio
 Franco Navarro

2 goals

 Walter Casagrande
 Carlos Caszely
 Alejandro Hisis
 Hernán Darío Herrera
 Willington Ortiz
 Miguel Augusto Prince
 Fernando Baldeón
 Roberto Cabañas
 Gerónimo Barbadillo
 Venancio Ramos

1 goal

 Jorge Burruchaga
 Néstor Clausen
 Ricardo Gareca
 Daniel Passarella
 Miguel Ángel Russo
 Jorge Valdano
 Silvio Rojas
 Juan Carlos Sánchez
 Careca
 Sócrates
 Zico
 Juan Carlos Letelier
 Jorge Muñoz
 Héctor Puebla
 Manuel Asisclo Cordoba
 Sergio Angulo
 Hamilton Cuvi Rivera
 Hans Maldonado
 Rogelio Delgado
 Buenaventura Ferreira
 Ramón Hicks
 Justo Jacquet
 Alfredo Mendoza
 Jorge Martín Núñez
 Vladimiro Schettina
 César Cueto
 Jorge Hirano
 Juan Carlos Oblitas
 Julio César Uribe
 José Manuel Velásquez
 Carlos Aguilera
 José Batista
 Enzo Francescoli
 Mario Saralegui
 Bernardo Añor
 Douglas Cedeño
 Pedro Febles
 Herbert Marquez
 René Torres

1 own goal

 Miguel Ángel Noro (playing against Brazil)
 Lizardo Garrido (playing against Paraguay)

See also
1986 FIFA World Cup qualification (UEFA)
1986 FIFA World Cup qualification (CONCACAF)
1986 FIFA World Cup qualification (CAF)
1986 FIFA World Cup qualification (AFC)
1986 FIFA World Cup qualification (OFC)

External links
 FIFA.com Reports
 RSSSF Page
 Results and scorers

 
World
FIFA World Cup qualification (CONMEBOL)
1986 FIFA World Cup qualification